This is a list of flag bearers who have represented Australia at the Olympics.

Flag bearers carry the national flag of their country at the opening ceremony (oc) and closing ceremony (cc) of the Olympic Games.

See also 
Australia at the Olympics

References

 Flag
Australia